A conjectural portrait is a portrait made of a historical figure for whom no authentic contemporary portrait is available.  The depiction, then, may be variously informed by written accounts of physical appearance, conjecture based on the subject's culture and background, and/or the artist's conception of the subject's inner essence.

Iconic portraits
Certain conjectural portraits have become iconic of their subjects, and are widely recognizable as such, with few being aware that they are not authentic portraits.  For example, portraits of Christopher Columbus and Joan of Arc are widely recognized.

See also
Forensic facial reconstruction
Great man theory

Historiography
Iconography
Portrait art